Mogammat Nasief Morris (born 16 April 1981) is a South African former professional footballer who played as a central defender. He left his country in 2001 to pursue a career in Europe, going on to play mostly in Greece but also in Spain and Cyprus. Morris won 37 caps for the South Africa national team between 2004 and 2009.

Club career

Greece
Born in Cape Town, Morris started his career at local Santos F.C. before signing for Greek club Aris Thessaloniki in June 2001, for €350.000. In his second season in the Superleague he played 27 games (two goals) as the latter club finished in sixth position, thus qualifying to the UEFA Cup.

After two years, Morris joined fellow league side Panathinaikos FC. He made his UEFA Champions League debut on 1 October 2003 in a 1–1 group stage home draw against Rangers. During his five-year tenure he never appeared in less than 21 league matches, as his team won the double in the 2003–04 campaign; additionally, he made 14 Champions League and 18 UEFA Cup appearances.

Spain
At the beginning of 2008–09, Morris was loaned out to Recreativo de Huelva in Spain. He made his La Liga debut on 31 August 2008, playing the full 90 minutes in a 1–0 derby away win against Real Betis.

Morris only missed one league match for the Andalusians, scoring on 3 May 2009 in 2–1 away triumph over CA Osasuna in the last minute, but Recre eventually suffered relegation. In the following season, still on loan, he moved to another Spanish top level team, Racing de Santander.

Morris started in his first games with the Cantabrians, but eventually was only third or fourth-choice stopper – 11 appearances in the first 15 rounds, only one in the following 23. On 5 May 2010, he was sent off in a 5–1 home loss against Sevilla FC.

Later years
In July 2010, after it was announced that Panathinaikos would not extend his contract with the club, Morris signed with Apollon Limassol from Cyprus. After one season, the 30-year-old returned to his country and joined SuperSport United FC.

International career
Morris made his debut with the South Africa national team in 2004. In that same year, he was temporarily suspended by FIFA from all competitions after attempting to attack a referee during a 2–1 loss against Zambia on 21 February.

Morris was selected for the Bafana Bafana squad that appeared in the 2008 Africa Cup of Nations, in an eventual group stage exit in Ghana.

Career statistics
Score and result list South Africa's goal tally first, score column indicates score after Morris goal.

References

External links

1981 births
Living people
South African people of Malay descent
Soccer players from Cape Town
South African soccer players
Association football defenders
Santos F.C. (South Africa) players
SuperSport United F.C. players
Milano United F.C. players
Super League Greece players
Aris Thessaloniki F.C. players
Panathinaikos F.C. players
La Liga players
Recreativo de Huelva players
Racing de Santander players
Cypriot First Division players
Apollon Limassol FC players
South Africa international soccer players
2008 Africa Cup of Nations players
South African expatriate soccer players
Expatriate footballers in Greece
Expatriate footballers in Spain
Expatriate footballers in Cyprus
South African expatriate sportspeople in Greece
South African expatriate sportspeople in Spain